John P. Smith (1912–1972) was a general superintendent of the Long Island State Park Commission.

Born in Raterson, New Jersey, Smith moved to Islip where he attended and later graduated from Pratt Institute in 1933. From 1946 to 1968 he was superintendent of Heckscher State Park and, prior to his death, resided in Belmont Lake State Park where the commission had its headquarters. Smith died at the age of 60 on September 13, 1972, while being treated for a stroke at Good Samaritan Hospital Medical Center in West Islip, New York.

References

1912 births
1972 deaths
Pratt Institute alumni
People from West Islip, New York